Paracoryphellidae is a taxonomic family of brightly coloured sea slugs, specifically nudibranchs, marine gastropod mollusks.

Genera and species
Genera within the family Paracoryphellidae include:
 Chlamylla Bergh, 1886
 Paracoryphella M. C. Miller, 1971
 Polaria Korshunova, Martynov, Bakken, Evertsen, Fletcher, Mudianta, Saito, Lundin, Schrödl & Picton, 2017
 Ziminella Korshunova, Martynov, Bakken, Evertsen, Fletcher, Mudianta, Saito, Lundin, Schrödl & Picton, 2017

References

 
Fionoidea